Yang Ren (楊任) is a fictional character in the novel Fengshen Bang

Yang Ren may also refer to:

 Yang Ren (scholar) (楊仁), Eastern Han Dynasty scholar
  (楊任), general serving under Eastern Han Dynasty warlord Zhang Lu

See also
 :zh:楊任, a disambiguation page in Chinese Wikipedia